7th Division (also known as Sword division) was a Finnish Army division in the Continuation War. The division was formed Savo-Karjala military province from the men in Pohjois-Savo (Northern Savonia) and Pohjois-Karjala (North Karelia) civil guard districts.

History

As a component of the VII Corps, the 7th Division took part in the Army of Karelia's 1941 conquest of East Karelia.

At the start of the war the 7th Division was the westernmost division of the VII Corps, the westernmost division of the Army of Karelia, intended to operate between Lake Ladoga and Lake Opega as part of the Finnish invasion of East Karelia.  By July 1941 the division was commanded by Colonel Antero Svensson and had advanced to the Matkaselkä Railway and pushed the Soviets back towards Lake Ladoga.

The 7th Division captured Sortavala, a Russian town since 1917 but which had previously been part of Finland, on 8 August 1941 after a fierce battle.  The division advanced between Ladoga and Opega, uniting with the 11th Division it attacked east of Kotkozero to capture Lumatjarvi  crossroads on 13 September.  Continuing to operated with the 11th Division the 7th Division helped to capture Petrozavodsk after penetrating Soviet lines to the south of the city.  The 7th Division reached the Svir river by October.  The tired division failed to cross the river on 6 October but succeeded the following day.

During the 1944 Soviet advances the 7th Division participated in the defence of Loimola during the July Battle of Nietjärvi.  

By the 4th of September 1944, the division had been subordinated to the II Corps. During the Soviet Svir-Petrozavodsk Offensive of 1944, the division fought a delaying action from the river Svir first to Petrozavodsk and eventually to the Sortavala region.

Organization
After forming the division consisted of the following sub-units:
Infantry Regiment 9
Infantry Regiment 30
Infantry Regiment 51
Light Detachment 15
Field Artillery Regiment 2
Heavy Artillery Battalion 28
Engineer Battalion 35
Signals Battalion 26

7th Division was mostly equipped according to division generic organization, only some material quantities were lacking.

Commanders
Colonel Antero Svensson (18 December 1941 promoted to major general) 17 June 1941 – 1 August 1943
Colonel William Häkli
Major general Selim Isakson 28 January 1944 – 15 November 1944

Losses
Based on the periodic reports made by units to Finnish General Headquarters the total losses suffered by the 7th Division in killed, wounded and missing during the Continuation War were 12,384 men, the second-highest losses suffered by the Finnish divisions during the war.

See also 
List of Finnish divisions in the Winter War
List of Finnish divisions in the Continuation War

References

Sources 

Divisions of Finland
Military units and formations of Finland in World War II